Epsilon Ursae Majoris is a star in the northern constellation of Ursa Major. The designation is Latinised from ε Ursae Majoris and abbreviated Epsilon UMa or ε UMa. It is officially named Alioth . Despite being designated "ε" (epsilon), it is the brightest star in the constellation and at magnitude 1.77 is the thirty-third brightest star in the sky.

It is the star in the tail of the bear closest to its body, and thus the star in the handle of the Big Dipper (or Plough) closest to the bowl. It is also a member of the large and diffuse Ursa Major moving group. Historically, the star was frequently used in celestial navigation in the maritime trade, because it is listed as one of the 57 navigational stars.

Physical characteristics

Its spectral type is A1p; the "p" stands for peculiar, as its spectrum is characteristic of an α2 Canum Venaticorum variable. Epsilon Ursae Majoris, as a representative of this type, may harbor two interacting processes. First, the star's strong magnetic field separating different elements in the star's hydrogen 'fuel'. In addition, a rotation axis at an angle to the magnetic axis may be spinning different bands of magnetically sorted elements into the line of sight between Epsilon Ursae Majoris and the Earth. The intervening elements react differently at different frequencies of light as they whip in and out of view, causing Epsilon Ursae Majoris to have very strange spectral lines that fluctuate over a period of 5.1 days. The kB9 suffix to the spectral type indicates that the calcium K line is present and representative of a B9 spectral type even though the rest of the spectrum indicates A1.

Epsilon Ursae Majoris's rotational and magnetic poles are at almost 90 degrees to one another. Darker (denser) regions of chromium form a band at right angles to the equator.

It has long been suspected that Epsilon Ursae Majoris is a spectroscopic binary, possibly with more than one companion.  A more recent study suggests Epsilon Ursae Majoris's 5.1-day variation may be due to a substellar object of about 14.7 Jupiter masses in an eccentric orbit (e=0.5) with an average separation of 0.055 astronomical units.  It is now thought that the 5.1-day period is the rotation period of the star, and no companions have been detected using the most modern equipment.

Epsilon Ursae Majoris has a relatively weak magnetic field, 15 times weaker than α Canum Venaticorum, but it is still 100 times stronger than that of the Earth.

Name and etymology

ε Ursae Majoris (Latinised to Epsilon Ursae Majoris) is the star's Bayer designation.

The traditional name Alioth comes from the Arabic alyat al-hamal ("the sheep's fat tail"). In 2016, the International Astronomical Union organized a Working Group on Star Names (WGSN) to catalog and standardize proper names for stars. The WGSN's first bulletin of July 2016 included a table of the first two batches of names approved by the WGSN; which included Alioth for this star.

This star was known to the Hindus as Añgiras, one of the Seven Rishis.

Namesakes
The United States Navy's Crater class cargo ship  was named after the star.

See also
 List of brightest stars
 List of nearest bright stars
 Lists of stars
 Historical brightest stars

References

Alpha2 Canum Venaticorum variables
Ap stars
A-type giants
Ursa Major Moving Group

Big Dipper
Ursa Major (constellation)
Ursae Majoris, Epsilon
4905
BD+56 1627
Ursae Majoris, 77
112185
062956
Alioth